This is a list of the number one songs on the Billboard Hot Latin Tracks in 2005.

See also
Billboard Hot Latin Tracks

References 

United States Latin Songs
2005
2005 in Latin music